Mahmut Hekimoğlu (25 October 1955 – 10 September 2016) was a Turkish actor and film producer.

Filmography

As actor 

 Çakma Hayat (Film) 2013
 Sevgi Bağlayınca (TV series) - Cemil 2010
 Hür Adam (Film) - Doctor Tahir 2010
 IV. Osman (TV series) - Hasan 2009
 Kırmızı Işık (TV series) - Tuncay 2008
 Kollama (TV series) - 2nd season  Nizam 2009
 Karanfilli Yarim (Video) 2008
 Ana Hakkı Ödenmez (Film) 2008
 Merhaba / Dim Çayı Sevdalıları (TV film) 2007
 Koçero (TV film) 2007
 Dönüş (TV film) 2007
 Yeşeren Düşler (TV series) - Aziz Bey 2006
 Yalnız Efe (TV film) - Yörük Hoca 2006
 Dilan Gelin (TV series) - Derviş 2006
 Anka Kuşu (Film) - Cemal Bey 2006
 Memleket Hikayeleri - Bir Sepet Elma (TV film) 2005
 Şubat Soğuğu (TV series) - Serdar 2004
 Türkü Filmi (TV series) 2004
 Sen Küçüksün (TV film) 2004
 Hayatın İçinden (TV series) - Ahmet 2004
 Harput Güneşi (TV series) 2004
 Fırtına Hayatlar (TV series) - Remzi 2004
 Celal Oğlan (TV film) 2004
 Büyük Buluşma (TV series) - 1st Sezon  İmam 2004
 Yeşilçam Denizi (TV program) 2003
 Sırlar Dünyası / Sır Kapısı (TV series) - Ahmet 2002
 Ona Bakma Bana Bak (TV series) 2000
 Kimyacı (TV series) - Metin Aydın 2000
 Durduramadım (Film) 1999
 İlişkiler (TV series) - Sıtkı 1997
 Palavra Aşklar (TV series) 1995
 Ayrı Dünyalar (TV series) 1995
 Ölüm Oyunu (Film) - Kemal 1994
 Son Gün Son Gece (Film) 1994
 Kadın Severse (Film) - Engin 1994
 Denizciler Geliyor (TV series) 1994
 Gülpembe (Film) 1993
 Barışta Savaşanlar (TV series) 1993
 Muallim Bey (TV series) 1992
 Mahallenin Muhtarları (TV series) - Kenan 1992
 Aile Bağları (TV series) - Macit 1991
 Şükür Allahım (Film) - Mahmut 1990
 Sadık Dost (Film) 1988
 Kurt Payı (Film) 1988
 Kumar 2 (Video) 1988
 Bir Eski Yangın (Film) 1988
 Vurgun (Film) 1987
 Kan Kırmızı Süt Beyaz (Film) 1987
 Evlerden Biri (Film) - Semih 1987
 Bütün Kuşlar Vefasız (Film) 1987
 Bir Çember Kırılırken (Film) - Nihat 1987
 Prenses (Film) - Selim 1986
 Kader Böyle İstedi (Film) 1986
 Güvercinim (Film) - Doğan 1986
 Gelin Oy (Film) - Mahmut 1986
 Öç (Video) 1984
 Bin Kere Ölmek (Film) - Muhsin 1983
 Bataklıkta Bir Gül (Film) - Bülent 1983
 Adile Teyze (Film) - Mahmut 1982
 Çile Tarlası (Film) - Alişan 1980
 Hayat Harcadın Beni (Film) - Yaşar 1979
 Kaybolan Yıllar (Film) - Ömer 1978
 Tatlı Kaçık (Film) - Turgut / Hasan 1977
 Lanet / İlenç (Film) - Ömer 1977
 Gülen Gözler (Film) - Temel 1977
 Perişan (Film) - Metin Akel 1976
 Evlilik Şirketi (Film) - Ali 1976
 Bodrum Hakimi (Film) - Ali Rıza 1976
 Arabacının Aşkı (Film) - Gazeteci Tayyar 1976
 Aile Şerefi (Film) - Selim 1976
 Yakalarsam Severim (Film) 1975
 Salak Bacılar (Film) - Osman 1975
 Köçek (Film) - Adnan 1975
 Kadınlar (Film) 1975
 Dam Budalası (Film) 1975
 Cellat (Film) - Cahit 1975
 Yatık Emine (Film) - Kumandan 1974
 Kızım Ayşe (Film) - Ömer 1974
 Öksüzler (Film) - Kenan 1973
 Ben Doğarken Ölmüşüm (Film) - Mete 1973

As producer 

 Sevgi Bağlayınca (TV series) 2010
 Bir Aşk Yeter (Film) 1989
 Umutların Ötesi (Video) 1988
 Kurt Payı (Film) 1988
 Belki Yarın (Film) 1988
 Vurgun (Film) 1987
 Evlerden Biri (Film) 1987
 Prenses (Film) 1986
 Güvercinim (Film) 1986
 Gelin Oy (Film) 1986
 Güldür Yüzümü (Film) 1985
 Öç (Video) 1984
 Dil Yarası (Film) 1984
 Kahır (Film) 1983
 Bin Kere Ölmek (Film) 1983
 Bataklıkta Bir Gül (Film) 1983
 Çile Tarlası (Film) 1980
 Hayat Harcadın Beni (Film) 1979

References

External links
 
 Mahmut Hekimoğlu at SinemaTürk

1955 births
2016 deaths
Turkish male film actors
Turkish film producers
People from Adana
Turkish male television actors
Deaths from cancer in Turkey
Deaths from prostate cancer